ISBT can stand for:

 International Society of Blood Transfusion
 International Student Badminton Tournament (or International Solibad Badminton Tournament)
 Inter State Bus Terminals in India